Pai Herói is a Brazilian telenovela produced and broadcast by TV Globo. It premiered on 29 January 1979 and ended on 18 August 1979, with a total of 178 episodes. It's the twenty second "novela das oito" to be aired on the timeslot. It is created and written by Janete Clair and directed by Gonzaga Blota, Wálter Avancini and Roberto Talma.

Cast 
 Tony Ramos - André Cajarana
 Elizabeth Savalla - Carina (Catarina Limeira Brandão)
 Paulo Autran - Bruno Baldaracci (Nuno)
 Glória Menezes - Ana Preta (Ana Maria Garcia)
 Carlos Zara - César Limeira Reis
 Rosamaria Murtinho - Valquíria Brandão
 Cláudio Cavalcanti - Gustavo Gurgel (Benedito da Conceição)
 Lélia Abramo - Januária Brandão
 Maria Fernanda - Gilda Baldaracci
 Jonas Bloch - Rafael Baldaracci
 Flávio Migliaccio - Genésio Camargo
 Jorge Fernando - Cirilo Baldaracci
 Fernando Eiras - Romão Baldaracci
 Dionísio Azevedo - Seu Garcia (Nestor Garcia)
 Beatriz Segall - Norah Limeira Brandão
 Emiliano Queiroz - Horácio Brandão
 Lícia Magna - Adélia
 Osmar Prado - Pepo (Pedro Varella)
 Nádia Lippi - Aline Gonçalves
 Paulo Gonçalves - Leôncio Gonçalves
 Ana Lúcia Ribeiro - Lena Camargo
 Sônia Regina - Jenny (Genivalda Garcia Baldaracci)
 Fernando José - Mário Renner
 Carlos Kroeber - Dr. Tiago
 Ivan Cândido - Reginaldo Brandão
 Yara Lins - Irene Brandão
 Nildo Parente - Haroldo Brandão
 Suzana Faini - Jussara Brandão
 Reinaldo Gonzaga - Hilário Brandão
 Thaís de Andrade - Odete Brandão
 Monah Delacy - Eugênia Brandão Reis
 Hélio Ary - Dr. Soares
 Maria Helena Dias - Filhinha (Felipa Baldaracci)
 Maria Helena Velasco - Mirtes Camargo
 Manfredo Colassanti - Pietro Baldaracci
 Rejane Marques - Clara Baldaracci
 Rogério Bacelar - Gil (Gilberto Baldaracci)

References 

TV Globo telenovelas
1979 telenovelas
Brazilian telenovelas
1979 Brazilian television series debuts
1979 Brazilian television series endings
Portuguese-language telenovelas